Thomas or Tom Costello may refer to:

 Tom Costello (music hall) (1863–1943), British music hall comedian and singer
 Tom Costello (jockey) (1866–?), American jockey
 Thomas W. Costello (born 1945), politician from Vermont in the United States
 Thomas Costello (hurler) (born 1978), Irish hurler from Tipperary
 Tom Costello (politician), Irish Labour Party politician, mayor of Galway, 2007–2008
 Tom Costello, CEO and founder of Cuil
 Tom Costello (journalist) (born 1963), NBC News journalist
 Thomas Moore Costello (1883–1954), lawyer, judge and political figure in Ontario
 Thomas Joseph Costello (1929–2019), American prelate of the Catholic Church
 Thomas Costello (bishop), Irish bishop

See also 
 Tom Costelloe (disambiguation)